"Niagara Falls (Foot or 2)" is a song by American record producer Metro Boomin, American rapper Travis Scott and Atlanta-based rapper 21 Savage, from Metro's second studio album Heroes & Villains (2022). It was produced by Metro Boomin, Allen Ritter and Jacob Wilkinson-Smith, with additional production from Peter Lee Johnson.

Background
Cactus Jack Records' Chase B and Travis Scott first previewed the song on their podcast .WAV Radio in October 2020. The song leaked in January 2021 on Spotify, but was soon removed from the platform.On November 30, 2022, Metro Boomin revealed on Twitter that the song would be on his album Heroes & Villains, which was then released a few days later.

Composition
The song features a trap beat with a "chilling" piano loop.

Critical reception
The song received generally positive reviews from critics. Robin Murray of Clash wrote, "'Niagara Falls (Foot Or 2)' is a real highlight – it's never less than entertaining." Mosi Reeves commented on 21 Savage's line "Mike Vick, number 7, I'm a dog", calling it a "funny" reference to the Bad Newz Kennels dog fighting investigation. Hamza Riaz regarded the song as one of the best tracks from Heroes & Villains.

Charts

Certifications

References

2022 songs
Metro Boomin songs
Travis Scott songs
21 Savage songs
Songs written by Metro Boomin
Songs written by Travis Scott
Songs written by 21 Savage
Songs written by Allen Ritter
Song recordings produced by Metro Boomin
Song recordings produced by Allen Ritter